Narsaq-85  is a football club based in Narsaq, Greenland. They play in the Coca Cola GM.

Football clubs in Greenland
Association football clubs established in 1985
1985 establishments in Greenland